Jose Luiz Ferreira Rodrigues (born July 6, 1946) is a former Brazilian football player and manager.

Coaching career
In 1997, Zeca signed with Japan Football League club Kawasaki Frontale and became a goalkeeper coach. In 1999, the club joined new league J2 League and won the champions. He also managed 1 game as caretaker in J.League Cup in April. In 2000, the club was promoted to J1 League and he became a new manager. However the club won only 2 matches in first 10 matches and he was sacked in May.

Managerial statistics

References

External links
José Luiz Ferreira Rodrigues (Zeca) at Palmeiras official site

1946 births
Living people
Brazilian footballers
Sociedade Esportiva Palmeiras players
Expatriate football managers in Japan
J1 League managers
Kawasaki Frontale managers
Association footballers not categorized by position
Brazilian football managers